Waitākere College is a state coeducational secondary school located in Henderson, Auckland, New Zealand, established in 1975. A total of  students from Years 9 to 13 (ages 13 to 18) attend Waitākere College as of 

Students entering the college are allocated into one of three "Houses". The house names use Māori words: Aroha (Love), Manawanui (Perseverance), and Matauranga (Knowledge). Their respective mascots are; a Dragon, a Lion and a Dolphin. During the course of the year students can earn points for their house with good behaviour in class and good marks. These points are added up every week in a house assembly to determine the winner for that particular week. This also happens at the end of terms and a final one at the end of the year shows which house has won that year with the most points. 

Waitākere College offers an extra 'Performing Arts' option run by Stephen Nightingale. Entry is based on an audition process and the course runs for years 9 and 10. It covers drama, dance, music and singing, theatre, film/television, editing, theatre lighting, make-up and costume. As part of the course, students are required to take part in the school's annual musical.

Waitākere College is often used as a filming location for the New Zealand soap opera Shortland Street, as the location of Ferndale High School.

Notable former pupils
 Shayne Elliott (born 1963/64), New Zealand banker, CEO of ANZ Bank.
 Sione Lauaki (1981–2017), All Black

References 

1975 establishments in New Zealand
Educational institutions established in 1975
Henderson-Massey Local Board Area
New Zealand secondary schools of S68 plan construction
Secondary schools in Auckland
Schools in West Auckland, New Zealand